Likhi is a village and former non-salute princely state in Gujarat, western India.

History 
The Sixth Class princely state and taluka, covering 9 square miles in Mahi Kantha. It was ruled by Makwana Kolis of Thakor title of Chauhan Dynasty 'non-jurisdictional' talukdars (compare Hadol State), the state being within the jurisdiction of Sabar Kantha.

In 1901 it comprised the town and four other villages, with a combined population of 959, yielding 5,512 Rupees state revenue (1903–1904, mostly from land), paying no tribute.

See also 
 List of Koli people
 List of Koli states and clans
 Koli rebellions

References 

Princely states of Gujarat
Koli princely states